Levan "Leo" Gabriadze (Levan Revazis dze Gabriadze; , Levan Revazovich Gabriadze; born 16 November 1969) is a Georgian-Russian actor and film director. He is best known for directing the 2014 horror film Unfriended.

Biography

Gabriadze was born in Tbilisi, then part of the Soviet Georgia. His father, Revaz Gabriadze, was an actor, writer and director. By age 12, Leo was already working in his father's productions.

At age 17 he was invited to star in one of the main roles of the film Kin-dza-dza!. He graduated from the workshop of Shota Rustaveli Theatre and Film University, specialized in acting and set design.

He served in the Soviet Army, Air Defense Forces with the rank of private, post of a fireman.

In 1990 he entered the University of California (UCLA) (Los Angeles) in the Faculty of Design and Animation. In 2000 he moved to Moscow, where he became the advertising director of the film company Bazelevs.

In 2010 he made his first feature film Lucky Trouble which won the audience award "Golden Taiga" in the festival "Spirit of Fire" in Khanty-Mansiysk in February 2011.

In the year 2014 he directed the horror film Unfriended.

In 2015, he made a film (″Unfriended″), which was released in conjunction with Universal.

In 2017, he finished work on an animated film based on the stories of his father Rezo Gabriadze ″Rezo″. The film was released in May 2018.

Filmography

As actor
Zneli dasatskisi (1990, as Actor)
Kin-dza-dza! (1986, as Gedevan Alexandrovich Alexidze - 'Fiddler')
Passport (1990)

As director
Lucky Trouble (Vykrutasy, 2011)
Yolki 2 (2011, segment director, as Leo Gabriadze)
Yolki 3 (2013, segment director, as Leo Gabriadze)
Unfriended (2014)
Rezo (film) (2017)

References

External links

Levan Gabriadze at Georgian National Filmography

1969 births
Actors from Tbilisi
Male film actors from Georgia (country)
Russian male film actors
Film directors from Georgia (country)
Russian film directors
Living people
Georgian emigrants to Russia